Homchand Pooran (born 14 February 1979) is a Guyanese cricketer. He played in eleven first-class matches for Guyana from 1998 to 2009.

See also
 List of Guyanese representative cricketers

References

External links
 

1979 births
Living people
Guyanese cricketers
Guyana cricketers